The olf  is a unit used to measure the strength of a pollution source. It was introduced by Danish professor P. Ole Fanger; the name "olf" is derived from the Latin word , meaning "smelled".

One olf is the sensory pollution strength from a standard person defined as an average adult working in an office or similar non-industrial workplace, sedentary and in thermal comfort, with a hygienic standard equivalent of 0.7 baths per day and whose skin has a total area of 1.8 square metres. It was defined to quantify the strength of pollution sources that can be perceived by humans.

The perceived air quality is measured in decipol.

Examples of typical scent emissions

See also 
 Sick building syndrome

References 

 Professor Ole Fanger's page at the Technical University of Denmark, includes curriculum vitae mentioning him proposing the unit called olf. 

Units of measurement
Olfaction